The 1970–71 West Midlands (Regional) League season was the 71st in the history of the West Midlands (Regional) League, an English association football competition for semi-professional and amateur teams based in the West Midlands county, Shropshire, Herefordshire, Worcestershire and southern Staffordshire.

Premier Division

The Premier Division featured 18 clubs which competed in the division last season, along with one new club:
Wellingborough Town, joined from the Metropolitan League

League table

References

External links

1970–71
W